Qaleh-ye Khalileh (also Romanized as Qal‘eh-ye Khalīleh; also known as Khalīl and Khalīleh) is a village in Borborud-e Sharqi Rural District, in the Central District of Aligudarz County, Lorestan Province, Iran. At the 2006 census, its population was 124, in 28 families.

References 

Towns and villages in Aligudarz County